The University of Cincinnati College-Conservatory of Music (CCM) is a performing and media arts college of the University of Cincinnati in Cincinnati, Ohio. Initially established as the Cincinnati Conservatory of Music in 1867, CCM is one of the oldest continually operating conservatories in the US.

The college is an accredited institution of the National Association of Schools of Dance (NASD), the National Association of Schools of Music (NASM), the National Association of Schools of Theatre (NAST), and a member of the University/ Resident Theatre Association (U/RTA). In addition, the University of Cincinnati and all regional campuses are accredited by the Higher Learning Commission.

History

Early years 
The Cincinnati College-Conservatory of Music was formed in August 1955 from the merger of the Cincinnati Conservatory of Music, formed in 1867 as part of a girls' finishing school, and the College of Music of Cincinnati, which opened in 1878. CCM was incorporated into the University of Cincinnati on August 1, 1962. The college is sometimes incorrectly referred to as the Cincinnati Conservatory of Music.

Some of Cincinnati's professional performing arts organizations can trace their origins back to CCM. CCM's first opera department was established in 1917 under the leadership of Ralph Lyford, an American composer and conductor. In 1920 Lyford founded the Summer Zoo Opera at the Cincinnati Zoological Gardens, a summer performance series that eventually evolved into what is now known as Cincinnati Opera. Cincinnati Ballet's debut performances took place at Wilson Auditorium on the University of Cincinnati campus in 1964 and 1965. In 1966, the directorship of the ballet company passed on to David McLain, who at the time also headed CCM's Dance Division. Cincinnati Ballet's early connection to CCM gave the new company studio space for classes and rehearsals, access to talented students, and performance space in Wilson Auditorium.

Present day 
CCM has an enrollment of about 1,430, with a relatively even number of undergraduate and graduate students. It is the largest single source of performing arts presentations in Ohio, with nearly one thousand performances each academic year. Many of these performances are free to University of Cincinnati students and CCM now offers both a music minor and a media production minor. CCM also offers a wide variety of arts elective courses that are open to all University of Cincinnati students.

Departments and degree programs 
CCM is organized into eight academic divisions, many of which contain several different departments or programs. These areas of the school offer multiple degree options – bachelor of arts (BA), bachelor of fine arts (BFA), bachelor of music (BM), master of arts (MA), master of music education (MME) master of fine arts (MFA), master of music (MM), doctor of musical arts (DMA), doctor of philosophy (PhD) and artist diploma (AD) – as follows:
 Composition, Musicology and Theory
 Composition (BM, MM, DMA)
 Musicology (MM, PhD)
 Music Theory (MM, PhD)
 Ensembles and Conducting
 Choral Conducting (MM, DMA)
 Commercial Music Production (BM)
 Jazz Studies (BM, MM)
 Orchestral Conducting (MM, DMA)
 Wind Conducting (MM, DMA)
 General Studies
 Music (BA, Minor)
 Keyboard Studies
 Harpsichord (BM, MM, DMA, AD)
 Organ (BM, MM, DMA, AD)
 Piano (BM, MM, DMA, AD)
 Media Production (BFA, Minor)
 Music Education (BM, MM, MME)
 Performance Studies
 Strings
 Classical Guitar (BM, MM)
 Double Bass (BM, MM, DMA, AD)
 Harp (BM, MM, DMA, AD)
 Viola (BM, MM, DMA, AD)
 Violin (BM, MM, DMA, AD)
 Violoncello (BM, MM, DMA, AD)
 Voice (BM, MM, DMA)
 Woodwinds/Brass/Percussion
 Bassoon (BM, MM, DMA, AD)
 Clarinet (BM, MM, DMA, AD)
 Flute (BM, MM, DMA, AD)
 Horn (BM, MM, DMA, AD)
 Oboe (BM, MM, DMA, AD)
 Percussion (BM, MM, DMA, AD)
 Saxophone (BM, MM, DMA, AD)
 Trombone (BM, MM, DMA, AD)
 Trumpet (BM, MM, DMA, AD)
 Tuba and Euphonium (BM, MM, DMA, AD)
 Theatre Arts, Production and Arts Administration
 Acting (BFA)
 Arts Administration (MA)
 Dance (BFA)
 Musical Theatre (BFA)
 Opera (AD)
 Theatre Design and Production
 Costume Design and Technology (BFA, MFA)
 Lighting Design and Technology (BFA, MFA)
 Make-up & Wig Design (MFA)
 Sound Design (BFA, MFA)
 Stage Design, Props and Scenic Art (BFA)
 Stage Design (MFA)
 Stage Properties (MFA)
 Stage Management (BFA, MFA)
 Technical Production (BFA)
The college also offers many pre-college, professional development and continuing education programs through the CCM Prep and Summer Programs Office.

Academics

Music
CCM offers postgraduate, graduate and undergraduate degrees in music, along with an academic minor. Doctor of Musical Arts degrees are offered in all performance, conducting, and academic areas (except classical guitar and jazz studies) including Ph.D. programs in musicology, music history and music theory. Advanced degrees called Artist Diplomas are available in most performance areas as well. Master of Music degrees are available in all those programs, including classical guitar and jazz studies, as well as collaborative piano and music education. All undergraduate music programs are performance-based and attain a Bachelor of Music degree. A music BA is offered.

Musical Theater
The musical theater program at CCM is the oldest bachelor's degree program in the U.S., the most selective program at the University of Cincinnati, and is one of the nation's top programs. According to Playbill, CCM is represented on Broadway the second-most of any institution during the 2017–2018 season. When the COVID-19 pandemic caused the cancellation of the musical theater program's annual senior showcase in New York City, CCM became the first program in the nation to produce a "virtual senior showcase" for casting agents and industry professionals.

Opera
CCM Opera and vocal studies ranked second in the United States in 2017  and 2020, and Backstage Magazine included CCM on its 2021 list of "12 College Vocal Programs You Should Know." The Masters program focuses on stage experience, vocal technique, coaching and academic musicality. Masters students and recent alumni are represented in the nation's top young artist programs, including the Lyric Opera of Chicago, San Francisco Opera and Opera Theater Saint Louis. Each March, CCM holds its Opera Scholarship Competition, a vocal competition eligible to students in CCM's graduate opera program, featuring five prizes including full-tuition scholarships plus $10,000 to $15,000 in cash prizes.

Acting for Stage and Screen
CCM offers a BFA in acting designed to train students for the dramatic theater as well as for work in film and television. While the majority of programs related to the school's theater departments are undergraduate, a number of Master of Fine Arts degree tracks are offered in theater design and production. In 2015, The Hollywood Reporter named CCM number 12 on its list of the top 25 undergraduate drama schools in the world.

Theater Design and Production (TDP) 
CCM TDP is one of two schools in the country to offer an MFA program in Makeup and Wig Design, and one of very few to offer an MFA in Stage Properties. Featuring an 8,500 square foot scene shop, 3,000 square foot costume shop, and wig, make-up and prosthetics studios it is one of the best schools for hands-on training and learning. CCM TDP offers 13 different degrees all with hands-on training for each discipline. Alumni have gone on to work with Feld Entertainment, Hamilton, Cirque Du Soleil, and many other notable companies.

Dance
Dance study at CCM emphasizes ballet. The department offers a Bachelor of Fine Arts in dance.

Arts Administration
CCM offers both an MA in Arts Administration and a dual MBA/MA in Arts Administration in conjunction with the University of Cincinnati's Carl H. Lindner College of Business. The program is focused on preparing students to lead and manage arts organizations.

Media Production
The largest and fastest growing program at CCM is media production (formerly known as "electronic media"). The program offers a general Bachelor of Fine Arts degree in media production, as well as an academic minor. The program uses a track-based curriculum with tracks in Film and Television Production, Broadcast Media Production and Multimedia Production with focus areas in web-site design, audio production and sports media. The curriculum in each track shares a common first year experience for all students. It requires two semesters of internships, a year-long capstone, and 18 credits in a minor or certificate program in addition to general education foundation from classes across campus. Media Production student organizations include a student radio station and student-run campus television station. Media Production alumni are heavily involved in the college's "CCM Onstage Online" performance broadcast series and "School, Stage and Screen" podcast series.

Campus

CCM Village
Completed in 1999, CCM Village was built at an overall cost of $93.2 million. Under the supervision of Henry Cobb, of Pei Cobb Freed & Partners, renovated structures were merged with new buildings, creating four overall centers: Mary Emery Hall, the Corbett Center for the Performing Arts, Memorial Hall, and the Dieterle Vocal Arts Center.

Highlights of the CCM Village include:

 8,500 square foot scene shop
 3,000 square foot costume shop
 wig, make-up and prosthetics studios
 1,500 square foot design/drafting studio
 800 square foot light lab
 sound design studios
 three dance studios (with observation room), therapy and dressing rooms
 five large movement and acting rehearsal rooms
 digital recording and editing studio, a MIDI lab and computer workstations for music notation and sequencing programs
 full orchestral, choral and band rehearsal spaces
 jazz record library housing over 10,000 historic LP's
 Dale Warland Singers Archive, which includes more than 110 choral works and arrangements, first edition copies of all 270 works commissioned by the Dale Warland Singers and a media library that has more than 300 audio and video recordings of the ensemble’s performances
 Walter and Marilyn Bartlett Television Production Center, consisting of a full multi-camera television studio and control room
 Lawrence A. Leser Newsroom
 J. Ralph Corbett Audio Production Center with audio recording studio
 Judy and Jim Van Cleave Multimedia Laboratory
 Jack and Joan Strader Radio Center, a closed circuit cable radio station, a teleconferencing facility and the TV Cable Channel 4
 Electronic piano lab with 28 pianos
 Early Music and World Music lab
 Starbucks coffee chain location

The college's resources also include the Albino Gorno Memorial Library, also known as the "CCM Library," which is located in UC's Carl Blegen Library. The library is adjacent to the CCM Village. Its music library houses more than 150,000 volumes, including books, music scores, periodicals, microforms and recordings that support the full range of programs offered at CCM. The Albino Gorno Memorial Music Library also contains group study spaces, high fidelity media players and a computer lab.

Media Production facilities
CCM's on-campus media production facilities include a television studio, audio recording studio, 4K Avid Editing lab, Bearcast radio station, multiple audio/video/multimedia workstation labs, digital cinema cameras, lighting, grip and field audio production equipment. These labs, studios and field equipment are scheduled, maintained and available checkout by media production majors. The labs and studios include:

 the multi-camera Bartlett Television Studio, control room and master control area, which features a Grass Valley GV Director switcher and three high end Grass Valley LDX 80 HD cameras that are controlled remotely via a GV OCP camera control unit through fiber connection. Shows are recorded in 10 bit ProRes to an SSD via the Blackmagic Design Hyperdeck Studio. Students monitor the shows with a 55" multi-view monitor. The studio light grid features IKAN high output LED panels and Fresnel fixtures controlled via an ETC Color Source lighting board.
 The Ralph J. Corbett Audio Production Center includes acoustically treated recording spaces, multi-track control rooms, digital audio workstations and audio post-production suites using ProTools, Logic and Adobe Audition technologies. The studios are designed to support surround sound production and mix environments.
 The Jack and Joan Strader Radio Center offers radio production facilities for the student-run internet radio station and media organization, Bearcast Media. The Bearcast facilities includes 4K digital cinema cameras, lights, audio equipment and a computer workstation for Adobe video audio and web site development tools.
 The Avid Media Composer/Adobe Creative Suite 4K Postproduction Lab, which includes Avid Artist DNxIQ hardware  run on iMac Retina 5K 27" 4.2 Ghz i7 Quad Core  computer workstation along with color calibrated BenQ EL2870U 28 inch 4K HDR10 Editing Interface Monitors and BenQ EW3270U 32" 4K HDR Full Screen Editing Monitors.
 The Judith and Jim Van Cleave Multimedia Laboratory offers Media Production students access to computer hardware and software, including the Adobe Creative Suite.

Nippert Rehearsal Studio
The Nippert Rehearsal Studio, named for Louise Dieterle Nippert, was originally the site of the University of Cincinnati gymnasium and main basketball court from 1911 until 1951. Its windows overlook Nippert Stadium. Now, the space primarily acts as the main rehearsal hall for all of CCM's mainstage productions.

Performance Halls 
CCM's performance halls include the 663-seat Corbett Auditorium, the 378-seat modified thrust Patricia Corbett Theater, the 250-seat Robert J. Werner Recital Hall, the 140-seat Watson Recital Hall, and the flexible black box Cohen Family Studio Theater. The performance spaces are utilized by the college's large number of performing ensembles, which include:

 two concert orchestras
 four wind ensembles
 two choruses
 several big bands and jazz combos
 a variety of chamber music ensembles and speciality ensembles

Corbett Auditorium, Patricia Corbett Theater and the Cohen Family Studio Theater are also utilized by CCM's Division of Theatre Arts, Production and Arts Administration (TAPAA), which produces approximately 16 musicals, opera, plays and dance productions annually. In 2017, CCM's five main performance halls participated in a ~$15M renovation.

Student organizations 

 CCM Flute Club
 CCM Graduate Student Association (GSA)
 CCM Student Tribunal
 Ohio Collegiate Music Education Association
 Opera Club
 Phi Mu Alpha
 Sigma Alpha Iota, Eta-Iota
 Society of Composers Incorporated
 TubaCats
 UC Cello Society
 UC Choruses
 UC Clarinet Club
 UC Horn Club
 UC Saxophone Alliance
 UC Symphony Orchestra

Ranking 
Multiple departments at CCM have ranked nationally among university programs for a graduate music degree, including its opera/voice program, its conducting program, French horn, music composition and drama programs. CCM holds the #2 spot on Playbill's list of "10 Most Represented Colleges on Broadway," behind New York University. In 2011, CCM was recognized as Ohio's first and only Center of Excellence in Music and Theatre Arts by the Ohio Board of Regents. In 2019, CCM's Jazz Studies program was named the inaugural college affiliate of Jazz at Lincoln Center, which allowed nearly two dozen students and faculty members to accompany Wynton Marsalis and the Jazz at Lincoln Center Orchestra on an international residency in São Paulo, Brazil, from June 22–30, 2019. More recently, Backstage Magazine included CCM in its list of "12 College Vocal Programs You Should Know" and the College Gazette ranked the school 2nd in its list of the top ten performing arts universities in the US.

Notable projects

Opera Fusion: New Works 
Opera Fusion: New Works (OF:NW) is a longrunning partnership between CCM and Cincinnati Opera. Created in 2011, OF:NW offers composers or composer/librettist teams the opportunity to workshop an opera during a 10-day residency in Cincinnati. Residencies utilize the personnel, facilities, and artistic talent of both CCM and Cincinnati Opera. The workshops are cast with a combination of both CCM students and professional artists, and each workshop concludes with a free public presentation of excerpts followed by an audience question and answer session.

OF:NW's current co-artistic directors are Robin Guarino from CCM and Evans Mirageas from Cincinnati Opera. From the program’s inception in 2011 through 2018, Guarino was co-artistic director alongside Cincinnati Opera’s Marcus Küchle. OF:NW has fostered the development of 12 new American operas to date, including The Hours, Awakenings, Castor and Patience, Hadrian, Intimate Apparel, Some Light Emerges, Fellow Travelers, Morning Star, Champion and Doubt.

CSO/CCM Diversity Fellowship 
The CSO/CCM Diversity Fellowship is a performance fellowship program for string players co-hosted by the Cincinnati Symphony Orchestra and CCM. Founded in 2015 with grant funding by The Andrew W. Mellon Foundation, the program provides a two-year learning experience for graduate-level violin, viola, violoncello and double bass players coming from populations that are historically underrepresented in classical music. The program accepts up to five fellows per year. Program participants receive scholarship support to complete a Master of Music or Artist Diploma degree at CCM while also receiving compensation to perform the equivalent of five weeks per season with the CSO.

As of the 2022-23 academic year and concert season 28 musicians have participated in the program, several of which have subsequently obtained positions in professional orchestras or been featured as soloists.

Blind Injustice 
The Ohio Innocence Project at the University of Cincinnati College of Law collaborated with Cincinnati Opera, the Young Professionals Choral Collective (YPCC) and CCM to workshop and produce the opera Blind Injustice, which premiered at Cincinnati Opera in 2019. The production was directed by CCM faculty member Robin Guarino. The opera was described as a "powerful piece of music theater" by the Wall Street Journal and "a powerful and moving work, as evident from the audience's enthusiastic response" by Opera News.

Noted faculty
The Ariel String Quartet (faculty 2012–present) is an award-winning ensemble that has served as CCM's official string quartet-in-residence since 2012. Formed in Israel in 1998, the Quartet includes violinists Gershon Gerchikov and Alexandra Kazovsky, violist Jan Grüning and cellist Amit Even-Tov.
Clara Baur was a German-born music teacher who founded the Cincinnati Conservatory of Music, which eventually merged with the College of Music of Cincinnati and the University of Cincinnati to form what is now known as the University of Cincinnati College-Conservatory of Music. The "Baur Room" in CCM's Corbett Center for the Performing Arts is named after Clara and her niece Bertha.
John Cage was an American composer and music theorist who served as composer-in-residence at CCM from 1967-68. A pioneer of indeterminacy in music, electroacoustic music, and non-standard use of musical instruments, Cage was one of the leading figures of the post-war avant-garde. 
Dorothy Delay was an American violin instructor who taught at CCM for nearly 30 years. Her former students include many noted violinists of the late 20th century. She also taught many significant orchestral musicians and pedagogues.
Robin Guarino (faculty 2008–present) is a theatre, opera and film director based in New York City and Cincinnati. Guarino has directed over 90 original productions and her work has been presented by opera companies, festivals, theaters and symphonies including the BAM Next Wave Festival, Canadian Opera Company, The Cincinnati Opera Avery Fisher and Alice Tully Hall, Seattle Opera, San Francisco Opera, HGOco, the Canadian Opera Company, The Glimmerglass Festival, The Bard Summer Festival, The Opera Theatre of St. Louis and Virginia Opera among others. She has served as co-artistic director of CCM's Opera Fusion: New Works initiative with Cincinnati Opera since its inception. 
Mara Helmuth is a composer with special interest in electroacoustic and computer music and research. Her compositions have received numerous performances in the U.S., Canada, Europe, and Asia. She has been on the board of directors of the International Computer Music Association and Society of Electroacoustic Music in the United States, and served as ICMA President. She serves as director of CCM's Center for Computer Music. 
Douglas Knehans (faculty 2008–present) is an American/Australian composer. He is the Norman Dinerstein Professor of Composition Scholar at CCM, where he also served as dean from 2008-10. Knehans is also the director of Ablaze Records, a company which records and produces music by living composers. 
 The LaSalle Quartet was a string quartet active from 1946 to 1987, which served as CCM's string quartet-in-residence from 1953-1987. After making its European debut in 1954, the LaSalle Quartet won international recognition for its masterful interpretations of the major works in the chamber music repertory. The Quartet became particularly well regarded as the leading interpreters of “The Second Viennese School,” performing complete cycles of the quartets of Schoenberg, Berg and Webern throughout the United States and Europe. Cellist Lee Fiser continued to teach at CCM until his retirement in 2017.
Elliot Madore (faculty 2021–present) is a Grammy Award-winning Canadian lyric baritone. One of the most sought-after singers of his generation, Madore has performed throughout Europe, Canada and the US. He was appointed an Associate Professor of Voice at CCM in August 2021.
Kevin McCollum is a Broadway producer who served a three-year term as Distinguished Visiting Professor at CCM beginning in 2015. A distinguished alumnus of the University of Cincinnati, McCollum (BFA Musical Theatre, 1984; HonDoc, 2005) is the Tony Award-winning producer of Rent, Avenue Q, In the Heights, Motown the Musical and many other acclaimed Broadway, Off-Broadway and touring productions.
Awadagin Pratt is an accomplished American concert pianist. In 1992 he won the Naumburg International Piano Competition and two years later was awarded an Avery Fisher Career Grant. In November 2009, Pratt was one of four artists selected to perform at a classical music event at the White House that included student workshops hosted by the First Lady, Michelle Obama, and performing in concert for guests including President Obama. He has performed two other times at the White House, both at the invitation of President and Mrs. Clinton.
Miguel Roig-Francolí (faculty 2000–present) is a music theorist, composer, musicologist and pedagogue who serves as CCM's Distinguished Teaching Professor of Music Theory and Composition. At CCM, he regularly teaches history of theory, sixteenth-century counterpoint, post-tonal theory, music theory pedagogy, and a seminar on the analysis of early music. He is the author of Harmony in Context (McGraw-Hill, 2nd edn., 2011) and Understanding Post-Tonal Music (McGraw-Hill, 2007; Chinese translation, Beijing: People's Music Publishing House, 2012; Routledge, 2nd edn, 2021).
Kurt Sassmannshaus (faculty 1983–present) is a violinist, teacher, and conductor. He is considered one of today's preeminent violin pedagogues. He is CCM's distinguished Dorothy Richard Starling Chair for Classical Violin, a position previously held by the late Dorothy Delay. Sassmannshaus has taught around the world, including master classes in Europe, the United States, Japan, China, and Australia, and has worked in close association with Dorothy DeLay both in Cincinnati and at the Aspen Music Festival and School.
Stuart Skelton (faculty 2021–present) is an internationally acclaimed and award-winning heldentenor. A graduate of CCM (MM Voice, '95), Skelton joined the college's Voice Performance faculty in August 2021 and was named CCM's J. Ralph Corbett Distinguished Chair in Opera in December 2021.
Italo Tajo was an Italian operatic bass who began teaching at CCM in 1966. He maintained a significant performance career before and during his 19 years as a faculty member at the college. After Tajo's death in 1993, his wife Indela Tajo donated a scholarship to CCM in Italo's name. The Italo Tajo Archive Room in CCM's Dieterle Vocal Arts Center is named after the former faculty member, and is filled with historical items from his career.
James Tocco (faculty 1991-2021) enjoyed a 30-year tenure as Professor of Piano and Eminent Scholar of Chamber Music at CCM. Tocco has a worldwide career as a soloist with orchestra, recitalist, chamber music performer and pedagogue. His repertoire of over 50 works with orchestra includes virtually the entire standard piano concerto repertoire, as well as more rarely performed works such as the Symphonie Concertante of Szymanowski, the Kammerkonzert of Alban Berg and The Age of Anxiety of Leonard Bernstein. Hailed in solo recitals for his interpretations of Beethoven, Chopin and Liszt, as well as composers of the 20th century, Tocco is one of the few pianists in the world to regularly program the keyboard works of Handel.
James Truitte (1923-1995) was a dancer who trained with Lester Horton and Alvin Ailey and became known as an authority on Horton's technique and choreography. He started teaching master classes at the conservatory in 1970, being appointed named associate professor in 1973, and in 1993, professor emeritus.

Noted alumni
Christy Altomare (B.F.A. Musical Theatre '08) – Originating the title role in the 2017 Broadway bound Anastasia, Sophie in Mamma Mia! (Broadway), and Wendla in the National Tour of Spring Awakening
Kathleen Battle (B.M. Music Education – 1970) – Soprano known for her roles at the Metropolitan Opera and other leading opera houses.
Shoshana Bean (B.F.A. Musical Theatre – 1999) – known for her role in Wicked as Elphaba.
Ashley Brown (B.F.A. Musical Theatre – 2004) – known for the title role in Broadway production of Mary Poppins
Elizabeth Brown (B.M. – 1975) – contemporary composer and performer
Kristy Cates (B.F.A. Musical Theatre – 1999) – Wicked
Kim Criswell (B.F.A. Musical Theatre – 1979)
David Daniels (B.M. Vocal Performance) – Countertenor of international fame.
Carmon Deleone (B.M. Music Performance - 1964, B.S. Music Education - 1965, M.M. Music Performance - 1967)  Assistant/Resident Conductor Cincinnati Symphony Orchestra (1968-1980), Music Director/Conductor Laureate of Illinois Philharmonic Orchestra, Music Director Emeritus of the Cincinnati Ballet (1969-2023), tour conductor for Juliet Prowse, touring musician (french horn) for Alan Sherman and Henry Mancini.
David P. DeVenney Professor of music and director of choral activities, West Chester University School of Music.
eighth blackbird (1997-2000) – Grammy Award-winning contemporary chamber music ensemble.
Stephen Flaherty (B.M. Composition – 1982) – Tony Award-winning composer of Ragtime
Tennessee Ernie Ford (1939) - composer, singer (baritone), radio announcer, television host and author.
Sara Gettelfinger (Actress; B.F.A. Musical Theatre – 1999)
David Goldsmith (Writer/Lyricist; B.F.A. Opera/Musical Theatre - 1985) - Motown: The Musical
Jason Graae (B.F.A. Musical Theatre 1980)
Kirsten Haglund – Miss America 2008
Albert Hague (CCM 1942) was a Tony Award-winning composer and lyricist best known for composing the score for the animated television special of How the Grinch Stole Christmas! He also wrote the score for the Broadway musical Redhead. Also an actor, Hague played music teacher Benjamin Shorofsky in the television series Fame.
Earl Hamner Jr. (BA, 1948; UC HonDoc, 2008) was an American television writer, producer and actor best known for creating and narrating the long-running autobiographical television program The Waltons.  A member of CCM's first class of broadcasting graduates, Hamner worked at Cincinnati-based radio station WLW before he began writing for TV and film. Hamner also wrote episodes of the original run of The Twilight Zone, created the television series Falcon Crest and wrote the original animated film adaptation of Charlotte's Web.
Randy Harrison (Actor; B.F.A. Musical Theatre – 2000)
Al Hirt – noted trumpeter
John Holiday - (M.M. Vocal Performance) American operatic countertenor who has appeared in supporting and leading roles with several American opera companies
Sarah Hutchings (D.M.A. Composition)
Lauren Kennedy (B.F.A. Musical Theatre – 1993)
Jennifer Korbee – singer/actress, starred in the Emmy nominated television show Hi-5
Leslie Kritzer (B.F.A. Musical Theatre – 1999) – Star of 2008 musical, A Catered Affair and originated the role of Serena in Legally Blonde: The Musical.
Aaron Lazar (M.F.A. Musical Theatre – 2000), Fabrizio in The Light in the Piazza on Broadway (also on PBS Broadcast), Carl-Magnus in A Little Night Music, Original Charles Darnay in A Tale of Two Cities, Impressionism on Broadway, Larry Murphy in the US National Tour of Dear Evan Hansen
Tyler Maynard (B.F.A. Musical Theatre) – Original Cast of Altar Boyz, Flotsum in Disney's The Little Mermaid on Broadway
Ricardo Morales, clarinetist
Dylan Mulvaney, (B.F.A Musical Theatre - 2019) Actress, Tiktok Influencer and LGBTQIA+ Activist. Known for "Days of Girlhood", Elder White in "The Book of Mormon" and "The Honest Show" 
Brad Myers (M.M. Jazz) - Jazz guitarist and producer
Pamela Myers - Musical Theatre.  Originated role of Marta in Company
Anton Nel, (M.M., D.M.A. Piano) Pianist and winner of the 1987 Naumberg International Piano competition, among others.
Daniel Okulitch, opera bass-baritone
Karen Olivo (B.F.A. Musical Theatre) – Rent, Brooklyn, original Vanessa in In the Heights, revival Anita in West Side Story (Tony Award win), and Angelica Schuyler in the Chicago cast of Hamilton
Heather Phillips (B.M.) operatic soprano
Faith Prince (Actor; B.F.A. Musical Theatre) Tony Award winner
Diana-Maria Riva (Actress; B.F.A. Dramatic Performance – 1991)
Harrison Sheckler (B.M. Piano 2019) Pianist and Virtual Choir Conductor.
Sara Shepard (B.F.A. Musical Theatre 2008) – Vivian cover on National Tour of Legally Blonde
Richard Sparks (D.M.A. Choral Conducting 1997)
Christian Tetzlaff, German classical violinist.
Art Tripp  (B.M. Music Performance 1966) - Cincinnati Symphony, Frank Zappa and the Mothers of Invention, Captain Beefheart and the Magic Band
Tony Yazbeck (B.F.A. Musical Theatre) – Al in the 2006 revival of A Chorus Line, Tulsa in the 2008 revival of Gypsy, Gabey in On the Town (Tony nomination), and J.M. Barrie in Finding Neverland
Constance Cochnower Virtue, composer who developed the Virtue Notagraph
Mitchell Walker (B.F.A Musical Theatre)
Donald Lawrence (B.F.A. Musical Theatre) - Multi Stellar award-winning gospel music singer, composer and choir director
Betsy Wolfe (B.F.A. Musical Theatre 2004) - known for her roles in "Waitress", "Falsettos", and "The Last Five Years."
Tamara Wilson (B.M. Vocal performance 2004) - operatic soprano who won the Richard Tucker Award in 2016
Li Chuan Yun, Chinese violin virtuoso and concert artist

References

External links
UC College-Conservatory of Music official site
CCM OnStage box office ticket sales site
University of Cincinnati official site
CCM profile on MajoringInMusic.com
Pei Cobb Freed & Partners CCM Structures

1819 establishments in Ohio
Educational institutions established in 1819
Music of Cincinnati
Music schools in Ohio
Conservatory Of Music
Universities and colleges formed by merger in the United States